The philosophy of perception is concerned with the nature of perceptual experience and the status of perceptual data, in particular how they relate to beliefs about, or knowledge of, the world. Any explicit account of perception requires a commitment to one of a variety of ontological or metaphysical views. Philosophers distinguish internalist accounts, which assume that perceptions of objects, and knowledge or beliefs about them, are aspects of an individual's mind, and externalist accounts, which state that they constitute real aspects of the world external to the individual. The position of naïve realism—the 'everyday' impression of physical objects constituting what is perceived—is to some extent contradicted by the occurrence of perceptual illusions and hallucinations and the relativity of perceptual experience as well as certain insights in science. Realist conceptions include phenomenalism and direct and indirect realism. Anti-realist conceptions include idealism and skepticism. Recent philosophical work have expanded on the philosophical features of perception by going beyond the single paradigm of vision (for instance, by investigating the uniqueness of olfaction).

Categories of perception
We may categorize perception as internal or external. 
 Internal perception (proprioception) tells us what is going on in our bodies; where our limbs are, whether we are sitting or standing, whether we are depressed, hungry, tired and so forth.
 External or sensory perception (exteroception), tells us about the world outside our bodies. Using our senses of sight, hearing, touch, smell, and taste, we perceive colors, sounds, textures, etc. of the world at large. There is a growing body of knowledge of the mechanics of sensory processes in cognitive psychology.
 Mixed internal and external perception (e.g., emotion and certain moods) tells us about what is going on in our bodies and about the perceived cause of our bodily perceptions.

The philosophy of perception is mainly concerned with exteroception.

Scientific accounts of perception

An object at some distance from an observer will reflect light in all directions, some of which will fall upon the corneae of the eyes, where it will be focussed upon each retina, forming an image. The disparity between the electrical output of these two slightly different images is resolved either at the level of the lateral geniculate nucleus or in a part of the visual cortex called 'V1'. The resolved data is further processed in the visual cortex where some areas have specialised functions, for instance area V5 is involved in the modelling of motion and V4 in adding colour. The resulting single image that subjects report as their experience is called a 'percept'. Studies involving rapidly changing scenes show the percept derives from numerous processes that involve time delays. Recent fMRI studies  show that dreams, imaginings and perceptions of things such as faces are accompanied by activity in many of the same areas of brain as are involved with physical sight. Imagery that originates from the senses and internally generated imagery may have a shared ontology at higher levels of cortical processing.

Sound is analyzed in term of pressure waves sensed by the cochlea in the ear. Data from the eyes and ears is combined to form a 'bound' percept. The problem of how this is produced, known as the binding problem.

Perception is analyzed as a cognitive process in which information processing is used to transfer information into the mind where it is related to other information. Some psychologists propose that this processing gives rise to particular mental states (cognitivism) whilst others envisage a direct path back into the external world in the form of action (radical behaviourism). Behaviourists such as John B. Watson and B.F. Skinner have proposed that perception acts largely as a process between a stimulus and a response but have noted that Gilbert Ryle's "ghost in the machine of the brain" still seems to exist. "The objection to inner states is not that they do not exist, but that they are not relevant in a functional analysis". This view, in which experience is thought to be an incidental by-product of information processing, is known as epiphenomenalism.

Contrary to the behaviouralist approach to understanding the elements of cognitive processes, gestalt psychology sought to understand their organization as a whole, studying perception as a process of figure and ground.

Philosophical accounts of perception
Important philosophical problems derive from the epistemology of perception—how we can gain knowledge via perception—such as the question of the nature of qualia. Within the biological study of perception naive realism is unusable. However, outside biology modified forms of naive realism are defended. Thomas Reid, the eighteenth-century founder of the Scottish School of Common Sense, formulated the idea that sensation was composed of a set of data transfers but also declared that there is still a direct connection between perception and the world. This idea, called direct realism, has again become popular in recent years with the rise of postmodernism.

The succession of data transfers involved in perception suggests that sense data are somehow available to a perceiving subject that is the substrate of the percept. Indirect realism, the view held by John Locke and Nicolas Malebranche, proposes that we can only be aware of mental representations of objects. However, this may imply an infinite regress (a perceiver within a perceiver within a perceiver...), though a finite regress is perfectly possible. It also assumes that perception is entirely due to data transfer and information processing, an argument that can be avoided by proposing that the percept does not depend wholly upon the transfer and rearrangement of data. This still involves basic ontological issues of the sort raised by Leibniz Locke, Hume, Whitehead and others, which remain outstanding particularly in relation to the binding problem, the question of how different perceptions (e.g. color and contour in vision) are "bound" to the same object when they are processed by separate areas of the brain.

Indirect realism (representational views) provides an account of issues such as perceptual contents, qualia, dreams, imaginings, hallucinations, illusions, the resolution of binocular rivalry, the resolution of multistable perception, the modelling of motion that allows us to watch TV, the sensations that result from direct brain stimulation, the update of the mental image by saccades of the eyes and the referral of events backwards in time. Direct realists must either argue that these experiences do not occur or else refuse to define them as perceptions.

Idealism holds that reality is limited to mental qualities while skepticism challenges our ability to know anything outside our minds. One of the most influential proponents of idealism was George Berkeley who maintained that everything was mind or dependent upon mind. Berkeley's idealism has two main strands, phenomenalism in which physical events are viewed as a special kind of mental event and subjective idealism. David Hume is probably the most influential proponent of skepticism.

A fourth theory of perception in opposition to naive realism, enactivism, attempts to find a middle path between direct realist and indirect realist theories, positing that cognition is a process of dynamic interplay between an organism's sensory-motor capabilities and the environment it brings forth. Instead of seeing perception as a passive process determined entirely by the features of an independently existing world, enactivism suggests that organism and environment are structurally coupled and co-determining. The theory was first formalized by Francisco Varela, Evan Thompson, and Eleanor Rosch in "The Embodied Mind".

Spatial representation
An aspect of perception that is common to both realists and anti-realists is the idea of mental or perceptual space. David Hume concluded that things appear extended because they have attributes of colour and solidity. A popular modern philosophical view is that the brain cannot contain images so our sense of space must be due to the actual space occupied by physical things. However, as René Descartes noticed, perceptual space has a projective geometry, things within it appear as if they are viewed from a point. The phenomenon of perspective was closely studied by artists and architects in the Renaissance, who relied mainly on the 11th century polymath, Alhazen (Ibn al-Haytham), who affirmed the visibility of perceptual space in geometric structuring projections. Mathematicians now know of many types of projective geometry such as complex Minkowski space that might describe the layout of things in perception (see Peters (2000)) and it has also emerged that parts of the brain contain patterns of electrical activity that correspond closely to the layout of the retinal image (this is known as retinotopy). How or whether these become conscious experience is still unknown (see McGinn (1995)).

Beyond spatial representation
Traditionally, the philosophical investigation of perception has focused on the sense of vision as the paradigm of sensory perception. However, studies on the other sensory modalities, such as the sense of smell, can challenge what we consider characteristic or essential features of perception. Take olfaction as an example. Spatial representation relies on a "mapping" paradigm that maps the spatial structures of the stimuli onto discrete neural structures and representations. However, olfactory science has shown us that perception is also a matter of associative learning, observational refinement, and a decision-making process that is context-dependent. One of the consequences of these discoveries on the philosophy of perception is that common perceptual effects such as conceptual imagery turn more on the neural architecture and its development than the topology of the stimulus itself.

See also

 Anil Gupta
 Argument from illusion
 Arthur Schopenhauer
 Āyatana
 Binding problem
 Consciousness
 Direct realism
 Epistemology
 George Berkeley
 Hallucinations in the sane
 Immanuel Kant
 Idealism
 Indirect realism
 John McDowell
 Fiona Macpherson
 Map-territory relation
 Maurice Merleau-Ponty
 Mind's eye
 Multistable perception
 Open individualism
 Charles Sanders Peirce
 Perceptual conceptualism
 Philosophical realism
 Roderick Chisholm
 Sensorium
Solipsism
 Subjective character of experience
 Susanna Schellenberg
 Susanna Siegel
 Theories of perception
 Thomas Reid
 Transcendental idealism
 Vertiginous question
 Visual perception
 Visual space

References

Sources and further reading

 Chalmers DJ. (1995) "Facing up to the hard problem of consciousness." Journal of Consciousness Studies 2, 3, 200–219.
 Wikibooks: Consciousness Studies
 BonJour, Laurence (2001). "Epistemological Problems of Perception," The Stanford Encyclopedia of Philosophy, Edward Zalta (ed.). Online text
 Burge, Tyler (1991). "Vision and Intentional Content," in E. LePore and R. Van Gulick (eds.) John Searle and his Critics, Oxford: Blackwell.
 Crane, Tim (2005). "The Problem of Perception," The Stanford Encyclopedia of Philosophy, Edward Zalta (ed.). Online text
 Descartes, Rene (1641). Meditations on First Philosophy. Online text
 Dretske, Fred (1981). Knowledge and the Flow of Information, Oxford: Blackwell.
 Evans, Gareth (1982). The Varieties of Reference, Oxford: Clarendon Press.
 Flynn, Bernard (2004). "Maurice Merleau-Ponty," The Stanford Encyclopedia of Philosophy, Edward Zalta (ed.). Online text
 Hume, David (1739–40). A Treatise of Human Nature: Being An Attempt to Introduce the Experimental Method of Reasoning Into Moral Subjects. Online text
 Kant, Immanuel (1781). Critique of Pure Reason. Norman Kemp Smith (trans.) with preface by Howard Caygill, Palgrave Macmillan. Online text
 Lacewing, Michael (unpublished). "Phenomenalism." Online PDF
 Locke, John (1689). An Essay Concerning Human Understanding. Online text
 McCreery, Charles (2006). "Perception and Hallucination: the Case for Continuity." Philosophical Paper No. 2006-1. Oxford: Oxford Forum. Online PDF
 McDowell, John, (1982). "Criteria, Defeasibility, and Knowledge," Proceedings of the British Academy, pp. 455–79.
 McDowell, John, (1994). Mind and World, Cambridge, Massachusetts: Harvard University Press.
 McGinn, Colin (1995). "Consciousness and Space," In Conscious Experience, Thomas Metzinger (ed.), Imprint Academic. Online text
 Mead, George Herbert (1938). "Mediate Factors in Perception," Essay 8 in The Philosophy of the Act, Charles W. Morris with John M. Brewster, Albert M. Dunham and David Miller (eds.), Chicago: University of Chicago, pp. 125–139. Online text
 Moutoussis, K. and Zeki, S. (1997). "A Direct Demonstration of Perceptual Asynchrony in Vision," Proceedings of the Royal Society of London, Series B: Biological Sciences, 264, pp. 393–399.
 Noe, Alva/Thompson, Evan T.: Vision and Mind: Selected Readings in the Philosophy of Perception, Cambridge: MIT Press, 2002.
 Peacocke, Christopher (1983). Sense and Content, Oxford: Oxford University Press.
 Peters, G. (2000). "Theories of Three-Dimensional Object Perception - A Survey," Recent Research Developments in Pattern Recognition, Transworld Research Network. Online text
 Putnam, Hilary (1999). The Threefold Cord, New York: Columbia University Press.
 Read, Czerne (unpublished). "Dreaming in Color." Online text
 Russell, Bertrand (1912). The Problems of Philosophy, London: Williams and Norgate; New York: Henry Holt and Company. Online text
 Shoemaker, Sydney (1990). "Qualities and Qualia: What's in the Mind?" Philosophy and Phenomenological Research 50, Supplement, pp. 109–31.
 Siegel, Susanna (2005). "The Contents of Perception," The Stanford Encyclopedia of Philosophy, Edward Zalta (ed.). Online text
 Tong, Frank (2003). "Primary Visual Cortex and Visual Awareness," Nature Reviews, Neuroscience, Vol 4, 219. Online text
 Tye, Michael (2000). Consciousness, Color and Content, Cambridge, Massachusetts: MIT Press.
 Infoactivity Genesis of perception investigation

External links
 
 
 
 
 

Epistemology
Philosophy of mind
Perception